Sheila Clare Hollins, Baroness Hollins, (born 22 June 1946) is a professor of the psychiatry of learning disability at St George's, University of London, and was created a crossbench life peer in the House of Lords on 15 November 2010 taking the title Baroness Hollins, of Wimbledon in the London Borough of Merton and of Grenoside in the County of South Yorkshire.

Baroness Hollins founded the visual literacy charity Beyond Words  in 1989 to produce word free books for people with learning disabilities. She is Chair and Series Editor for Beyond Words 

She was President of the Royal College of Psychiatrists from 2005 to 2008, succeeded by Dinesh Bhugra. From 2012 to 2013 she was president of the British Medical Association and was formerly chair of the BMA Board of Science. In 2014 Pope Francis appointed her a member of the newly created Pontifical Commission for the Protection of Minors. The Baroness is also a member of the Scientific Advisory Board of the Centre for Child Protection and is President of the Royal Medical Benevolent Fund. She was appointed in 2019 by the Secretary of State for Health and Social Care to Chair the Oversight Panel to oversee Independent Care, Education and Treatment Reviews of people placed in Long Term Segregation.

Personal life
Hollins is married to Martin Hollins. She is the mother of Abigail Witchalls, who was stabbed and left paralysed in 2005, and has a son, Nigel. She is a Roman Catholic.

References

External links
Biography at Parliament.uk

 

 
 

1946 births
Living people
Crossbench life peers
Life peeresses created by Elizabeth II
British Roman Catholics
British psychiatrists
Academics of St George's, University of London
Members of the Pontifical Commission for the Protection of Minors
Presidents of the British Medical Association
British women psychiatrists
People's peers